The Audie Award for Faith-Based Fiction and Nonfiction is one of the Audie Awards presented annually by the Audio Publishers Association (APA). It awards excellence in narration, production, and content for a religious or spiritual audiobook released in a given year. Before 2019, this was given as two distinct awards, the Audie Award for Inspirational and Faith-Based Fiction (awarded since 2003) and the Audie Award for Inspirational and Faith-Based Nonfiction (awarded since 1997), known as the Audie Award for Inspirational or Spiritual Title before 2007.

Faith-based fiction and nonfiction recipients

2010s

2020s

Nonfiction recipients 1997–2018

1990s

2000s

2010s

Fiction recipients 2003–2018

2000s

2010s

References

External links 

 Audie Award winners
 Audie Awards official website

Faith-Based Fiction and Nonfiction
Awards established in 1997
English-language literary awards